Stanisław Solski (Kalisz, September 21, 1622 – Kraków, 9 August, 1701) was a Polish Jesuit mathematician and architect. He published several works in Polish and Latin.

Life 
There aren't information on early life and origin. Solski joined the Jesuit Order in 1638, before he studied in a school in Kalisz. He studied philosophy in Kalisz and then theology in Poznań. From 1652 to 1653 he was a teacher of poetry in Krosno and from 1653 to 1654 he taught poetry and rhetoric in Kamieniec Podolski.
In 1670 he left the mansion and move to Cracow where he occupied primarily architectural work, because he was the architect of the bishop Jan Malachowski. He designed and supervised the reconstruction and construction of churches and monasteries, including the church of St. Barbara.

Works 
Machina motum perpetuum exhibens, 1661
Machina exhibendo motui perpetuo artificiali idonea, 1663
Geometra Polski: Księga 1, Księga 2, Księga 3, 1683-1686
Architekt Polski, 1688

External links 

Polish mathematicians
Architects from Kraków
17th-century Polish Jesuits
1622 births
1701 deaths